is a district located in Miyagi Prefecture, Japan.

As of 2003, the district has an estimated population of 17,139 and a population density of 62.70 persons per km2. The total area is 273.34 km2.

Towns and villages
Marumori

Districts in Miyagi Prefecture